Stump Lake is a naturally formed lake located in Nelson County, North Dakota. It covers 15,742.4 acres, has 72.5 miles of shoreline, and has an average depth of 29.7 feet with a maximum depth of 73.3 feet. It is stocked by the North Dakota Department of Natural Resources with Walleye, Yellow Perch, and  Northern Pike.

Stump Lake's waters have risen 45 feet in the last few years, and are now at the levels of neighboring Devils Lake. Devil's Lake will overflow into Stump Lake if the surface level reaches . Stump Lake, like Devil's Lake, is an endorheic (closed) lake, and has no input or output of rivers or streams, and is only fed by rain or human sources. If water levels exceed  the combined lake would flow into the Sheyenne River.  This has not occurred since lake levels in this area have been recorded.

Stump Lake Park is found around the lake and is solely dedicated to it. Local Native Americans have referred to the lake as "Chicot" which translates as "a place of stumps".

The Stump Lake Park is the location of the Old Settler's Pavilion, listed on the U.S. National Register of Historic Places, which has been threatened by the rising water level.

References 

Lakes of North Dakota
Endorheic lakes of the United States
Nelson County, North Dakota